Ravelin Ridge is a ridge which extends north–south and rises to 1400 m (Jerez Peak) in northern Clarence Island, in the South Shetland Islands of Antarctica. It is connected to Urda Ridge to the south by Soyka Saddle, and has its east slopes drained by Treskavets, Orcho and Banari Glaciers.

The UK Antarctic Place-Names Committee (UK-APC) applied the name in 1971 following mapping by the Joint Services Expedition, 1970-71. The feature resembles a fortification, hence the use of the term "ravelin".

References
 

Ridges of the South Shetland Islands